Michael Stich was the defending champion but lost in the first round to Scott Draper.

Michael Chang won in the final 6–4, 6–3 against Richard Krajicek.

Seeds
A champion seed is indicated in bold text while text in italics indicates the round in which that seed was eliminated.

  Michael Chang (champion)
  Richard Krajicek (final)
  Thomas Enqvist (second round)
  Michael Stich (first round)
  Jan Siemerink (second round)
  Stefan Edberg (semifinals)
  Nicklas Kulti (first round)
  Jonas Björkman (quarterfinals)

Draw

External links
 1996 Infiniti Open draw

Los Angeles Open (tennis)
1996 ATP Tour